Property is a 2003 novel by Valerie Martin, and was the winner of the 2003 Orange Prize. In 2012, The Observer named Property as one of "The 10 best historical novels".

Plot summary
The book is set on a sugar plantation near New Orleans in 1828, and tells the story of Manon Gaudet, the wife of the plantation's owner, and Sarah, the slave Manon was given as a wedding present and who she has brought with her from the city. The story is centred on Manon and her resentment of Sarah. Sarah is not only Manon's slave, but also her husband's sex slave. The private drama of the estate is played out against the backdrop of civil unrest and slave rebellion.

Critical analyses
 Tim A. Ryan, "Mammy and Scarlett Done Gone: Complications of the Contemporary Novel of Slavery, 1986-2003." Calls and Responses: The American Novel of Slavery Since Gone with the Wind. Baton Rouge: Louisiana State UP, 2008: 149-84.

References

2003 American novels
Novels by Valerie Martin
Novels about American slavery
Novels set in Louisiana
Women's Prize for Fiction-winning works
Fiction set in 1828
Doubleday (publisher) books
Novels set in the 1820s